Taylor Turnquist (born August 14, 1997) is an American ice hockey player who currently plays for the Minnesota Whitecaps in the Premier Hockey Federation.

Career 

Turnquist attended Spring Lake Park High School, where she mostly played as a forward. Turnquist won national titles as a regular defender for the Clarkson University Golden Knights in 2017 and 2018. In 158 NCAA games over 4 years at Clarkson, Turnquist scored 8 goals and 40 points. As a senior she served as an assistant captain. She was versatile and willing enough to play some games at forward due to team injuries in her senior season.

Turnquist was drafted in the 4th round of the 2020 NWHL Draft and signed a one-year deal with the Boston Pride on July 22, 2020.

Personal life 
Turnquist is the daughter of Steve and Andrea, and has a brother, Luke. She grew up as a fan of the Minnesota Wild and Mikko Koivu. She is currently dating San Jose Sharks forward Nico Sturm, whom she met when both were freshmen at Clarkson.

Turnquist majored in business at Clarkson University.

Career stats

Source

Honours 
2019-20 Clarkson Coaches Award
2019-20 Named assistant captain for the Clarkson Golden Knights
2016-20 Named to ECAC Hockey All-Academic team for all four years at Clarkson

References

External links
 
 
 

1997 births
Living people
American women's ice hockey defensemen
Boston Pride players
Clarkson Golden Knights women's ice hockey players
Ice hockey players from Minnesota
Premier Hockey Federation players
People from Blaine, Minnesota
Minnesota Whitecaps players